"Our Love Affair" is a song recorded by Frank Sinatra with the Tommy Dorsey Band in 1940. which reached No. 5 in the Billboard charts. Its music is by Roger Edens and lyrics are by Arthur Freed. It was written for the M-G-M musical Strike Up the Band (1940), starring Mickey Rooney and Judy Garland.

Other recordings
 Judy Garland - recorded for Decca Records (catalog No. 3593A) on December 18, 1940.
 Harry Roy & His Band (vocal by Julie Dawn) - recorded 13 December 1940. (Regal Zonophone MR 3402).
 Glenn Miller & His Orchestra (vocal by Ray Eberle) (1940) - reached No. 8 in the Billboard charts.
 Dick Jurgens & His Orchestra (vocal by Harry Cool) (1940) - reached No. 10 in the Billboard charts.
 Tony Martin and Frances Langford recorded for Decca Records (catalog No. 3415A) on September 6, 1940.
 Alma Cogan (1962) - included in a compilation With Love in Mind (1986).
 Michael Feinstein - The M.G.M. Album (1989)

References

Sources

1940 songs
Frank Sinatra songs
Songs written for films